Maria Helena Vieira da Silva (13 June 1908 – 6 March 1992) was a Portuguese abstract painter. She was considered a leading member of the European abstract expressionism movement known as Art Informel. Her works feature complex interiors and city views using lines that explore space and perspective. She also worked in tapestry and stained glass.

Life
Vieira da Silva was born in Lisbon, Portugal. At an early age, she traveled around the world because her affluent father was a diplomat. During this time, she came in contact with various avant-garde groups, such as the Italian Futurists and the Ballets Russes. At the age of eleven she had begun seriously studying drawing and painting at the Academia de Belas-Artes in Lisbon. In her teen years she studied painting with Emília dos Santos Braga in Lisbon and Fernand Léger, sculpture with Antoine Bourdelle, and engraving with Stanley William Hayter. Vieira da Silva also worked with Fauve artist Othon Friesz.

In 1928 Vieira da Silva left Lisbon to study sculpture in Paris, but decided in 1929 to focus on painting. By 1930 she was exhibiting paintings in Paris; that same year she married the Hungarian painter Árpád Szenes. At the onset of World War II in 1939, Vieira da Silva moved to Portugal from France. The following year, she left for Rio de Janeiro, Brazil where she gained prominence as an artist for her dense and complex compositions.
After the War, Vieira da Silva lived and worked in Paris the rest of her life. She adopted French citizenship in 1956. Vieira da Silva received the French government's Grand Prix National des Arts in 1966, the first woman so honored. She was named a Chevalier of the Legion of Honor in 1979. She died in Paris on 6 March 1992.

Her name sometimes appears written as "Elena", but the correct version, in Portuguese, is "Helena".

A crater on Mercury has been named in her honor.

Work
Vieira da Silva is considered to be Portugal's greatest contemporary artist by many. In 1988 in honor of her 80th birthday, the Gulbenkian Museum in Lisbon and the Grand Palais in Paris had major retrospectives of her work.

Vieira da Silva’s initial work featured a decorative style of abstract patterning. She enjoyed toying with the idea of space and creating a false perception of space by having her painting set on a neutral background with flecks color giving a sense of depth.
In the 1930s Vieira da Silva began producing her characteristic works which were heavily impastoed, and overlaid with a complex arrangement of small rectangles. In 1943, Vieira da Silva exhibited in Peggy Guggenheim's show Exhibition by 31 Women at the Art of This Century gallery in New York. As she evolved as an artist, she focused more on spatial manipulations using a wide range of techniques. She employed detailed patterns to create fabricated architectural forms and worked with complex lines, luminous spots and patterned surfaces. By the late 1950s she was internationally known for her dense and complex compositions, influenced by the art of Paul Cézanne and the fragmented forms, spatial ambiguities, and restricted palette of cubism and abstract art. She is considered to be one of the most important Post-War abstract artists although she is not a “pure” abstract painter. Her work is related to French Tachisme, American Abstract expressionism, and Surrealism, as were many of her contemporaries who were painting in Post-War Paris during the mid to late 1940s and early 1950s. Her paintings often resemble mazes, cities seen in profile or from high above or even library shelves in what seems to be an allegory to a never-ending search for Knowledge or the Absolute. Vieira da Silva has also created many prints, designs, for tapestries, ceramic decorations, and stained glass windows.

She exhibited her work widely, winning a prize for painting at the São Paulo Art Biennial in São Paulo in 1961.

In 1966-76 she made a stained-glass window for the Saint Jacques church in Reims together with Josef Sima. In 1974 she made the painting A Library Burning which uses many of the elements from that window.
She decorated in 1988 the new Cidade Universitária subway station of Lisbon with azulejo panels.

In November 1994, the Árpád Szenes-Vieira da Silva Foundation was inaugurated in Lisbon, a museum that displays a large collection of paintings by both artists.

Public collections
Vieira da Silva’s work is included in the permanent collections of the Musée d'Art Moderne de Paris, the Stedelijk Museum, in Amsterdam, the National Museum of Women in the Arts, the Museum of Modern Art, New York, the Tate Gallery, in London, the National Gallery of Canada, in Ottawa, the Solomon R. Guggenheim Museum, in New York, and the San Francisco Museum of Modern Art.

Selected works
 As Bandeiras Vermelhas (1939, 80 × 140 cm)
 A Partida de Xadrez (1943, 81x100 cm)
 História Trágico-Marítima (1944, 81,5 × 100 cm)
 O Passeante Invisível (1949-1951, 132 × 168 cm)
 O Quarto Cinzento (1950, Tate Gallery, London, 65 × 92 cm)
 L'Allée Urichante (1955, 81 × 100 cm)
 Les Grandes Constructions (1956, 136 × 156,5 cm)
 Londres (1959, 162 × 146 cm)
 Landgrave (1966, 113,6 × 161 cm)
 Passage des miroirs (1971), Museo de Bellas Artes de Bilbao
 Terre de Sienne (1972), Museo Nacional Centro de Arte Reina Sofía, Madrid
 Bibliothéque en Feu (1974, 158 × 178 cm)
 Disaster (War) (1942), Musee National d'Art Moderne, Centre Georges Pompidou, Paris

See also
 La gare inondée (The Flooded Station)

Bibliography

References

1908 births
1992 deaths
20th-century French women artists
20th-century Portuguese women artists
French people of Portuguese descent
Art Informel and Tachisme painters
French women painters
Honorary Members of the Royal Academy
Modern painters
People from Lisbon
Portuguese women painters
School of Paris